The Pitäjänmäki industrial area is a western neighborhood of Helsinki, Finland. It is located in Pitäjänmäki district.

, the Pitäjänmäki industrial area, has 2,415 inhabitants living in an area of 1.38 km2.

References

External links
 

Pitäjänmäki